

Spock is a Java testing framework capable of handling the complete life cycle of a computer program. It was initially created in 2008 by Peter Niederwieser, a software engineer with GradleWare. A second Spock committer is Luke Daley (also with Gradleware), the creator of the popular Geb functional testing framework.

See also 
 JUnit, unit testing framework for the Java programming language
 Mockito, mocking extensions to JUnit
 TestNG, test framework for Java

References 

Cross-platform software
Java development tools
Java platform
Unit testing frameworks
Software using the Apache license